Luther Martin Kennett (March 15, 1807 – April 12, 1873) was a U.S. Representative from Missouri and mayor of the City of St. Louis.

Born in Falmouth, Kentucky, Kennett attended private schools.
After working as a county clerk of Pendleton County in 1822 and 1823 and of Campbell County, Kentucky in 1824, Kennett moved to St. Louis, Missouri in 1825 and found work in a mercantile establishment.
Kennett then spent several years in Europe on account of ill health, before returning to St. Louis in 1849.
He served as vice president of the Pacific Railroad Co.
He served as mayor of St. Louis from 1850 to 1853 as a member of the Whig Party, and served as president of the St. Louis & Iron Mountain Railroad for a period in 1853.

Kennett was elected as an Opposition Party candidate to the 34th Congress (March 4, 1855 – March 3, 1857).
After losing his re-election, he retired to his home near St. Louis Missouri.
He later moved to Europe in 1867, where he remained until his death in Paris, France, on April 12, 1873.
He was interred in Bellefontaine Cemetery, St. Louis, Missouri.

The city of Kennett, Missouri is named after him.

References

External links

1807 births
1873 deaths
People from Pendleton County, Kentucky
Missouri Whigs
Missouri Oppositionists
Opposition Party members of the United States House of Representatives from Missouri
Mayors of St. Louis
19th-century American railroad executives
19th-century American politicians
Members of the United States House of Representatives from Missouri